Final Fantasy Fables: Chocobo Tales, released in Japan as  is a Nintendo DS adventure game developed by h.a.n.d. and published by Square Enix. It was released in Japan on December 14, 2006, in North America on April 3, 2007, and in the PAL region in May 2007.

Final Fantasy Fables is a Final Fantasy spinoff starring a Chocobo in a setting which features common elements and creatures of the series. Music from the rest of the series is also reused. The game is composed of a number of minigames woven into a main adventure. The game was received positively by critics, who appreciated the originality and light-hearted nature of the title.

A sequel,  was released in Japan on December 11, 2008.

Gameplay
Chocobo Tales features a mix of three different types of gameplay; role-playing video game, exploration, and card battles. Players explore a 3D environment to find picture books. Upon finding them the player is transported into pop-up picture books to complete minigames and open the path to the next part of the story. The picture books take the form of Aesop's Fables and Grimm's Fairy Tales with the player character often taking the main role. Other Final Fantasy characters take up roles within the stories. More simplistic minigames, known as microgames, are also scattered throughout the world. Unlike minigames, these are not located within pop-up books, do not affect the game-world and are not required to progress in the game.

Throughout the course of the story, the player will participate in combat that is referred to as "pop-up duels". Battles utilize a deck constructed from cards they have collected from story events, minigames, microgames, or other characters. These decks are used to battle game's bosses in card battle games. Chocobo Tales features online multiplayer capabilities as well. Players can compete against each other in either pop-up duels or minigames. Both modes can connect either through local wireless or Nintendo Wi-Fi. Multiplayer includes playing the card battles in multi-card and online play by using Nintendo Wi-Fi, and the mini-games are multi-card and single-card download multiplayer as well. 2-4 players may team up for battles, or to participate in mini-games.

Story
The cast of characters includes such recurring characters as Chocobo, a White Mage named Shirma, a Black Mage named Croma, and others including Irma, the leader of the villains whose plan is to free Darkmaster Bebuzzu, the primary antagonist sealed inside Croma's book, Greeble and Peekaboo, a pair consisting of a skinny blue Chocobo and fat pink Chocobo, Jail Birds, a group of black Chocobos acting and dressed as stereotypical crooks (black ski masks and black and white striped shirts), and Volg, a black Chocobo who works alongside Greeble and Peekaboo.

The story is set in a fairly similar setting of Final Fantasy games such as Final Fantasy I and Final Fantasy V; a medieval setting despite having things such as airships. Throughout the course of the game, Chocobo must enter magical picture books which are taken from popular existing fairy tales and folk stories, adapted to suit the Final Fantasy universe and often starring a Chocobo as the main character.  There are eight storybooks to discover, each comprising two volumes, and the separate volumes often reference separate stories.

Development
Chocobo Tales was announced in the Summer of 2006. Initial details revolved around the main character, Chocobo, the opening sequence of the story and the picture book worlds. Further details included the pop-up duels and more information pertaining to the story. The game was produced by Yuki Yokoyama and took 20 staff members a year to create. The first decision made was to create a game about chocobos, market research showed that the characters are most popular with younger players, thus the game was designed for the Nintendo DS system, a popular system with that age group.

Audio

Much of the music in the game has been "borrowed" from other Final Fantasy games, newly rendered. The music played during card battles is the battle theme from Final Fantasy I, just as the theme played when traversing Mount Magma is the same as the theme of Gulug Volcano from the same game. The victory theme is the classic jingle, with the pre-VII aftertune. There are many other examples, such as the chocobo racing theme from FFVII, the Boss theme being borrowed from Final Fantasy VI, Irma's house is a rendition of the Final Fantasy IV sorrow music, and the end credits feature the airship theme from Final Fantasy VIII. Music from Final Fantasy III has also been borrowed, such as the crystal room theme and Gysahl theme.

Reception

Chocobo Tales sold over 78,000 copies in Japan by the end of 2006, just over two weeks after release. It sold 100,000 copies in Europe and 70,000 copies in North America by November 2007. Chocobo Tales met with overall positive reviews. RPGamer commented "Final Fantasy Fables is quite unique, offering a wide variety of gaming options. While building on the massive world of the Final Fantasy series, it takes a new spin in an attempt at something fresh." Edge magazine referred to the game as a "decent effort". They complimented the visuals, but stated "the execution and appeal is limited". IGN called Chocobo Tales a "surprisingly fun and engaging experience." GameSpot stated "it might look like just another kid's game, but there is a lot of quality gaming buried under the saccharine visuals."

The gameplay of the minigames and pop-up duels were well received. IGN called the mini-games "clever and fun" and stated the card battle "actually offers something simple yet challenging." GameSpy praised the minigames and card battles. RPGamer praised the amount of minigames and called the card battling system "impressive." GameSpot also praised the minigames and card battles, but commented some minigames were frustrating. The story received mix reviews. Some critics enjoyed it while others referred to it as childish. GameSpy commented the story was predictable and clichéd. RPGamer referred to it as a "light-hearted story". IGN stated the story is not huge or elaborate, but the game is surprisingly enjoyable for the older crowd. IGN also listed the game as the eighth greatest mini-game collection on the Nintendo Wii or DS.

References

External links
Official Website (Japanese)
Official Website (North American)

2006 video games
Adventure games
Chocobo games
Digital collectible card games
H.a.n.d. games
Multiplayer and single-player video games
Nintendo DS games
Nintendo DS-only games
Nintendo Wi-Fi Connection games
Role-playing video games
Video games developed in Japan
Video games scored by Nobuo Uematsu